András Vági (born 25 December 1988) is a Hungarian football player who plays for Soroksár.

Career
On 6 July 2022, Vági signed with Soroksár.

Honours
Diósgyőr
Hungarian League Cup (1): 2013–14

Club statistics

Updated to games played as of 15 May 2021.

References

External links
MLSZ 
HLSZ 

1988 births
Living people
Footballers from Budapest
Hungarian footballers
Association football defenders
MTK Budapest FC players
FC Aarau players
Diósgyőri VTK players
Paksi FC players
Mezőkövesdi SE footballers
Soroksár SC players
Nemzeti Bajnokság I players
Swiss Challenge League players
Nemzeti Bajnokság II players
Hungarian expatriate footballers
Expatriate footballers in Switzerland
Hungarian expatriate sportspeople in Switzerland